Salem Nasser Al shingel (born 27 June 1977) is a Bahraini athlete who specialises in the high jump. His biggest success is the silver medal at the 2002 Asian Championships.

His personal bests of 2.19 metres outdoors and 2.13 metres indoors, both set in 2006, are both current national records.

Competition record

References

1977 births
Living people
Bahraini male high jumpers
Athletes (track and field) at the 1998 Asian Games
Athletes (track and field) at the 2002 Asian Games
Athletes (track and field) at the 2006 Asian Games
Athletes (track and field) at the 2010 Asian Games
Asian Games competitors for Bahrain